Julia Krajewski (born 22 October 1988) is a German equestrian. She represented her country at the 2016 Summer Olympics, where she won the silver medal in the team eventing.

In 2021, at the 2020 Summer Olympics in Tokyo (delayed due to the COVID-19 pandemic), Krajewski won the gold medal in the individual eventing, becoming the first female athlete ever to do so.

CCI 5* Results

International Championship Results

Notable Horses 

 Cyrano 89 - 1994 Chestnut Oldenburg Gelding (Vikotria's Chirac x Dandy)
 2002 European Pony Championships - Team Gold Medal, Individual Silver Medal
 Leading Edge 2 - 1998 Dark Bay Oldenburg Gelding (Lady's King x Ramiro)
 2005 European Junior Championships - Team Gold Medal, Individual Fifth Place
 2006 European Junior Championships - Team Gold Medal, Individual Silver Medal
 Lost Prophecy - 2000 Black Oldenburg Gelding (Larioni x Lanthan)
 2008 European Young Rider Championships - Team Silver Medal, Individual Silver Medal
 After The Battle - 1995 Bay Gelding (General XX x Angriff XX)
 2009 European Young Rider Championships - Team Silver Medal
 Samourai du Thot - 2006 Bay Selle Francais Gelding (Milor Landais x Flipper d'Elle)
 2016 Rio Olympics - Team Silver Medal
 2017 Luhmuhlen CCI**** Winner

References 

1988 births
Living people
German female equestrians
Equestrians at the 2016 Summer Olympics
Equestrians at the 2020 Summer Olympics
Olympic equestrians of Germany
Olympic silver medalists for Germany
Olympic gold medalists for Germany
Olympic medalists in equestrian
Medalists at the 2016 Summer Olympics
Medalists at the 2020 Summer Olympics
People from Hanover Region
Sportspeople from Lower Saxony